The Central Product Classification (CPC) is a product classification for goods and services promulgated by the United Nations Statistical Commission. It is intended to be an international standard for organizing and analyzing data on industrial production, national accounts, trade, prices and so on.

The European Union's Classification of Products by Activity (CPA) is based on CPC.

See also
Classification of Types of Construction

References
 Central Product Classification (CPC) Version 2.1 (August 2015) 
 Central Product Classification, CPC Version 2 (Dec 2008) Parent page Detailed structure
 Central Product Classification, CPC Version 1.1 PDF

Product classifications